Zoltán Szarka (12 August 1942 in Csorna – 18 April 2016) was a Hungarian footballer. He was born in Csorna. He competed at the 1968 Summer Olympics in Mexico City, where he won a gold medal with the Hungarian team.

References

1942 births
2016 deaths
People from Csorna
Hungarian footballers
Olympic footballers of Hungary
Footballers at the 1968 Summer Olympics
Olympic gold medalists for Hungary
Medalists at the 1968 Summer Olympics
Association football goalkeepers
Sportspeople from Győr-Moson-Sopron County